AFL Queensland (AFLQ) is the governing body of Australian rules football in Queensland. AFL Queensland has over 216,000 participants (including Northern Rivers which is governed by AFLQ) playing at all levels of football from the introductory NAB AFL Auskick program to the AFL Masters Competition. AFL Queensland covers 13 regions, 24 leagues and 159 clubs.

Affiliated Leagues

Premier South East Queensland leagues
The highest grades of men's and women's Queensland community football are:
 Queensland Australian Football League (QAFL) (1903-)
 AFL Queensland Women's League (QWAFL) (2001-)
 North East Australian Football League (NEAFL) (was the highest level from 2010-2020)

Developmental leagues
 Queensland Football Association (QFA)
 AFL Northern Rivers

Regional leagues

AFL Cairns (1956-)
AFL Capricornia (1969-)
AFL Darling Downs (1971-)
AFL Mackay (1970-)
AFL Mount Isa (1967-)
AFL Townsville (1955-)
AFL Wide Bay (1987-)

All regions include their own affiliated junior leagues.

Foreign leagues
  AFL Fiji
  AFL Nauru
  AFL PNG
  AFL Solomon Islands
  AFL Vanuatu

Representative Side
The "Queensland Scorpions" are the state representative side and include under 16s, under 18s and open age groups and compete at the AFL Under 18 Championships and other state championships.

The "Country Kookaburras" represent the regional areas outside of South East Queensland, have under 14's, 16s, under 18s and open age groups and compete at the Australian Country Championships.

Due to the 2005 alignment with AFL PNG, both sides can also include players from Papua New Guinea.

Location
The league's offices are currently based at Leyshon Park, Yeronga.

Previous Australian rules governing bodies in Queensland
 Queensland Football League (QFL), later Queensland Australian National Football League (QANFL) and Queensland Australian Football League (QAFL) (1903–1996)
 Queensland Australian Football Council (1997–1999) which oversaw the Queensland State Football League (QSFL)

Grogan Medal
The Grogan Medal is awarded to the best and fairest in home and away rounds of each season's competition.

A best and fairest for the league has been awarded since 1946 however before it became a medal in 1947 and 1948 it was a trophy donated by Col Loel and Mick Byles known as the "Col Loel-Mick Byles" trophy. It was awarded to Kedron's Erwin Dornau in 1947, and Coorparoo's T. Calder in 1948 before being replaced by the Grogan Medal in 1949.

Queensland Team of the 20th Century 
On 16 June 2003, the Queensland Team of the 20th Century was announced at a gala function staged by AFLQ at the Brisbane Convention Centre.

The Team of the 20th Century is selected from the best home-grown talent and read as follows :

Coach of the Century:  Norm Dare.

Umpire of the Century:  Tom McArthur.

See also

List of Australian rules football leagues in Australia
Australian Rules football in Queensland

References

Sources
 The Brisbane Courier 1903 to 1933, weekly match reports and articles
 The Daily Mail 1903 to 1914, weekly match reports and articles
 Saturday Sports Observer 1903 to 1912, weekly match reports and articles
 John Morton's Queensland Australian Rules Year Book 1960 by John Morton, 1960
 Queensland Team of the Century Football Record Official Programme, AFL Queensland, 2003

External links 
 Official website
 List of Premiers, Best and Fairest players, Leading Goalkickers at the Full Points Footy website
  List of Grand Final Results at the AFLQ State League website
 Queensland Footy Discussion on BigFooty
 QAFF - Queensland footy history group

Australian rules football governing bodies
Australian rules football in Queensland
Sports governing bodies in Queensland